Eva Dell'Acqua (28 January 185612 February 1930) was a Belgian singer and composer of Italian ancestry.

Biography
Eva Dell'Acqua was born in 1856 in Schaerbeek, Brussels, Belgium, the daughter of the Italian painter Cesare Dell'Acqua and his wife Carolina van der Elst. She composed in the Romantic style and produced orchestral works, pieces for chamber orchestra, and other works for piano and solo voice, opera and stage.

Dell'Acqua's song "Villanelle" for coloratura soprano has been widely performed and recorded, and has appeared on film soundtracks including Get Hep to Love (1942) and I Married an Angel (1942). Dell'Acqua died on 12 February 1930 in Ixelles, Brussels, Belgium.

Works

Selected works include:

"Villanelle" (1893)
"La bachelette" (1896)
"Le tambour battant" (1900)
"Je donnerais" (1908)
"Swallow's Waltz" (1909)
"Chanson Provençale" (1912)
"Le clavecin" (1917)
"Pierrot the Liar" (1918)

References

External links
, Sumi Jo, Paris, 2006

1856 births
1930 deaths
19th-century classical composers
20th-century classical composers
Belgian classical composers
Belgian people of Italian descent
Musicians from Brussels
Romantic composers
Women classical composers
20th-century women composers
19th-century women composers